Benjamin Frank "Ben" Davis (born October 30, 1945) is a former professional American football cornerback and return specialist for ten years in the National Football League. He is the brother of political activist Angela Davis.

Early years
Benjamin Davis was born in 1945 in Birmingham, Alabama. His father, a graduate of St. Augustine's College, a traditional black college in Raleigh, North Carolina, was briefly a high school history teacher, but found it more lucrative to own and operate a service station in the black section of Birmingham. His mother, with an MA from New York University, was an elementary school teacher. The family owned a large home in a middle class mixed neighborhood called "Dynamite Hill" after so-called "night rider" terrorists began bomb attacks on civil rights leaders clustered there.

To avoid the racial strife for which Dynamite Hill was named, children in the Davis family spent time with friends and relatives elsewhere. Davis graduated from Fair Lawn High School in Fair Lawn, New Jersey, at the age of 15, then marked time by attending Bridgton Academy, a prep school in Maine until he was old enough to enroll in Defiance College in rural Defiance, Ohio.

"I went to Defiance because I was looking for the same type of environment as the prep school," Davis told Fred Greetham in 2001. "I was in the band in high school, but I decided to go out for the football team in college. By the time we were seniors, we were undefeated."

Professional career

Davis was drafted in the 17th (and last) round by the Cleveland Browns in the 1967 NFL Draft. With Paul Warfield, Gary Collins and Clifton McNeil already established as receivers, Davis was switched to a defensive role—and he did well. In his rookie year, he led the league in punt returns, averaging 12.7 yards per return, and one 52-yard return for a touchdown. He also led the Browns in returning kickoffs, with 27 returns totalling 708 yards, including one of 63 yards.

Only Leroy Kelly (15.6), Greg Pruitt (12.9) and Eric Metcalf (12.9) ever had better years, returning punts for the Browns.

In 1968, Davis started at cornerback, and led the team with 8 interceptions. Others were nipping at his heels: the season's 32 interceptions that year set a Browns' record. His individual performance is the 3rd-best in Browns history - and he still holds the record for seven consecutive games with an interception.

A torn anterior cruciate ligament benched Davis during the 1969 season, and half the 1970 season.

He was traded to the Detroit Lions in 1974 for a 5th-round draft pick. The Browns picked Jim Cope from Ohio State University, who fared poorly in the NFL. Davis, however, played two more seasons for the Lions before retiring from the field.

Post-NFL
Davis went into copier sales after his football career ended, then went into cable television and bought a radio station in Tulsa, Oklahoma. Since 1995, he has owned and operated Britt Business Systems, a Xerox dealer, in the Cleveland suburb of Beachwood, Ohio. Davis has lived in Cleveland since 1967, even commuting to Detroit when he played for the Lions.

Personal life
Davis and his wife Sylvia have two grown children, Cecilie and Ben III, who both live in California. Davis's sister, Angela Davis, is a prominent political activist. A younger brother, Reggie Davis, also attended Defiance College.

External links
NFL.com player page

References

1945 births
Living people
Players of American football from Birmingham, Alabama
Players of American football from Cleveland
American Conference Pro Bowl players
American football cornerbacks
American football return specialists
Cleveland Browns players
Detroit Lions players
Defiance Yellow Jackets football players
Fair Lawn High School alumni